Matej Jonjić (born 29 January 1991) is a Croatian professional footballer who plays as centre back for J1 League club Cerezo Osaka.
He has represented Croatia at youth level, having earned caps with all of the youth teams beginning with the Croatia under-16 team.

Club career
Born in Split, Jonjić is a product of the Hajduk Split academy. He was loaned out to NK Zadar in June 2009 where he made his professional debut and went on to appear in 13 matches for Zadar before he returned to Hajduk in January 2010. He later appeared in two matches for Hajduk in the second part of the 2009–10 season. After collecting only seven appearances in competitive matches in the following season, Jonjić was loaned to Zadar for the second time in June 2011.

Career statistics

References

External links
Profile at Cerezo Osaka 

1991 births
Living people
Footballers from Split, Croatia
Association football central defenders
Croatian footballers
Croatia youth international footballers
HNK Hajduk Split players
NK Zadar players
NK Osijek players
Incheon United FC players
Cerezo Osaka players
Shanghai Shenhua F.C. players
Croatian Football League players
K League 1 players
J1 League players
Chinese Super League players
Croatian expatriate footballers
Expatriate footballers in South Korea
Croatian expatriate sportspeople in South Korea
Expatriate footballers in Japan
Croatian expatriate sportspeople in Japan
Expatriate footballers in China
Croatian expatriate sportspeople in China